Cyana malayensis is a moth of the  family Erebidae. It is found in Peninsular Malaysia, Borneo and Palawan.

Subspecies
Cyana malayensis malayensis (Peninsular Malaysia, Borneo)
Cyana malayensis palawanensis (Palawan)

References

External links
The Moths of Borneo

Cyana
Moths described in 1914